Coast Miwok traditional narratives include myths, legends, tales, and oral histories preserved by the Coast Miwok people of the central California coast immediately north of San Francisco Bay.

Coast Miwok oral literature shares many characteristics of central California narratives, including that of their linguistic kinsmen the Lake, Plains, and Sierra Miwok, as well as other groups.

On-line examples of Coast Miwok narratives

 The Dawn of the World by C. Hart Merriam (1908)

References

 Kelly, Isabel T. 1978. "Some Coast Miwok Tales". Journal of California Anthropology 5:21-41. (23 short myths, including Theft of Fire and Bear and Fawns, narrated by Tom Smith and María Copa Frias in 1931-1932, with comparisons and a discussion of themes.)
 Loeb, Edwin M. 1932. "The Western Kuksu Cult". University of California Publications in American Archaeology and Ethnology 33:1-137. Berkeley. (A brief summary of the Creation myth, including Theft of Fire, pp. 113-114.)
 Merriam, C. Hart. 1910. The Dawn of the World: Myths and Weird Tales Told by the Mewan Indians of California. Arthur H. Clark, Cleveland, Ohio. Reprinted as The Dawn of the World: Myths and Tales of the Miwok Indians of California, in 1993 with an introduction by Lowell J. Bean, University of Nebraska Press, Lincoln. (Several Coast Miwok narratives, including Theft of Fire, are included.)

Miwok
Traditional narratives (Native California)
History of the San Francisco Bay Area